The STAL Dovern was a Swedish turbojet design of the early 1950s, named after a lake in Finspång municipality in Östergötland, Sweden.   Intended to power the Saab 35 Draken, this aircraft was powered by the Rolls-Royce Avon instead.  The Dovern did not enter production.

Design and development
The STAL company had been designing steam turbine engines and in the 1940s begun designing gas turbine engines. Their first running engine was the Skuten, ground tested in 1949 but not flown. The Dovern was the next design, featuring a nine-stage axial compressor and single-stage turbine. First run in 1951, the engine was flight tested during 1953 using an Avro Lancaster provided by Air Service Training.  The engine was installed underneath in a nacelle faired-in to the Lancaster's bomb bay. After several thousand hours of ground running and more than 300 hours of flight testing the engine was not selected, the Rolls-Royce Avon being preferred.

Applications
Avro Lancaster (test bed only)
Saab 35 Draken (intended application)

Variants
Dovern
Base variant.

Dovern IIA
Basic engine without de-icing

Dovern IIB
Compressor bleed air system added for ice protection.

Dovern IIC
Afterburning version producing  thrust.

Specifications (Dovern IIB)

See also

References

Notes

Bibliography

 Gunston, Bill. World Encyclopedia of Aero Engines. Cambridge, England. Patrick Stephens Limited, 1989. 
 

1950s turbojet engines